The Crichel Down affair was a British political scandal of 1954, with a subsequent effect and notoriety. The Crichel Down Rules are guidelines applying to compulsory purchase drawn up in the light of the affair.

Crichel Down land
Much of the land in question was part of the estate of Crichel House, owned by the 3rd Baron Alington. The land was purchased compulsorily in 1938 by the Air Ministry for use for bombing practice by the Royal Air Force. The purchase price when it was requisitioned was £12,006.

In 1940, the owner died on active service in the RAF, and the Crichel estate passed in trust to his only child, Mary Anna Sturt (then aged 11), who married Commander Toby Marten in 1949.

In 1941, Winston Churchill gave a promise in Parliament that the land would be returned to its owners, after the Second World War, when it was no longer required for the purpose for which it had been bought but the promise was reneged on. Instead the land (then valued at £21,000) was handed over to the Ministry of Agriculture who vastly increased the price of the land beyond the amount the original owners could afford (£32,000) and leased it.

Aftermath
In 1949, Toby and Mary Marten (daughter of the third Lord Alington), now the owners of the Crichel estate, began a campaign for the government's promise to be kept, by a return sale of the land. They gained a public inquiry. This inquiry was conducted by Sir Andrew Clark QC whose report was damning about actions in the case taken by those acting for the government. Archive material later released caused some shift in interpretation.

The minister responsible, Sir Thomas Dugdale, resigned and the Crichel estate part of the land was sold back to the owners (the Martens). The resignation of Dugdale has been taken as a precedent on ministerial responsibility, even though the doctrine supposed to arise from the affair is only partially supported by the details. Lord Carrington, Dugdale's junior minister, offered his resignation but was told to stay on.

Crichel had another fight against "authority" in the 1990s when Commander Marten objected to plans to redevelop a former paper mill the estate had sold to the local council in the mid-1950s. A fictional version of the affair was used in an episode of Foyle's War broadcast on ITV on 7 April 2013, which examined the conflict between "the greater good of the State" and natural justice as it affects government and the security services. The Crichel Down affair is also mentioned in The Late Scholar, a detective novel by Jill Paton Walsh.

Analysis
In 2002 Roger Gibbard wrote,

Footnotes

Bibliography

External links
 Summary of report

Political scandals in the United Kingdom
1954 in British politics
1954 in England